The 2015 Summit League baseball tournament took place from May 20 through 23. The top four regular season finishers of the league's six teams met in the double-elimination tournament held at Sioux Falls Stadium in Sioux Falls, South Dakota.  won the tournament and earned the Summit League's automatic bid to the 2015 NCAA Division I baseball tournament.

Seeding
The top four finishers from the regular season—not including Omaha, which is ineligible for the tournament as the 2015 season is the last in its transition from Division II to Division I—will be seeded one through four based on conference winning percentage. The teams will then play a double-elimination tournament.

Results

References

Tournament
Summit League Baseball Tournament
Summit League baseball tournament
Summit League baseball tournament